Tegal Buleud is a coastal district within Sukabumi Regency in West Java, Indonesia, about  south of the city of Sukabumi. Tegal Buleud is also a destination for surfing and fishing. Rubber production is a major industry in the area.

Currently being constructed is the steel industry in cibeureum, desa buni aish. It is the biggest industry in the south of Sukabumi Regency.

Populated places in West Java
Sukabumi Regency